The 27th annual Venice International Film Festival was held from 28 August to 10 September 1966.

Jury
 Giorgio Bassani (Italy) (head of jury)
 Lindsay Anderson (UK)  
 Luboš Bartošek (Czechoslovakia)
 Michel Butor (France)
 Lewis Jacobs (USA)
 Lev Kuleshov (Soviet Union)
 Joris Ivens (Netherlands)

Films in competition

Awards
Golden Lion:
The Battle of Algiers (Gillo Pontecorvo)
Special Jury Prize:
Yesterday Girl (Alexander Kluge)
Chappaqua (Conrad Rooks)
Volpi Cup:
 Best Actor - Jacques Perrin (Un uomo a metà)
 Best Actress - Natalya Arinbasarova (The First Teacher)
FIPRESCI Prize
The Battle of Algiers (Gillo Pontecorvo)
OCIC Award
Au Hasard Balthazar (Robert Bresson)
Honorable Mention - Yesterday Girl (Alexander Kluge)
Special Prize
The War Game (Peter Watkins)
 (Yosef Shalhin)
Lion of San Marco
Memorandum (Donald Brittain and John Spotton)
 (Hermína Týrlová and Giancarlo Zagni)
Best Film about Adolescence -  (Borislav Sharaliev)
Best Documentary -  (Joris Ivens)
Best Documentary - Television - Storm Signal (Robert Drew)
Lion of San Marco - Grand Prize
 (Yves Plantin and Alain Blondel)
 (Wladyslaw Slesicki)
The Girl and the Bugler (Aleksandr Mitta)
Plate 'Lion of San Marco'
The Ivory Knife: Paul Jenkins at Work (Jules Engel)
Best Experimental Film -  (Vittorio Armentano)
Best Sport Film - Hockey (Mica Milosevic)
Best Children's Film - The Kind-Hearted Ant (Aleksandar Marks & Vladimir Jutrisa)
Best Animated Film - Chromophobia (Raoul Servais)
Cultural and Educational Film -  (Claude Jutra)
Film about Architecture -  (Jaroslaw Brzozowski)
Plate
The Animal Movie (Grant Munro and Ron Tunis)
Jemima and Johnny (Lionel Ngakane)
Physics and Chemistry of Water (Sarah Erulkar)
 (Jirí Torman)
Documentary - Contemporary Life/Social -  (Piero Nelli)
Recreative Children's Film - Little Mole, for the episode  (Zdeněk Miler)
Children's Film - Educative-Didactical - Alexander and a Car without the Left Headlight (Peter Fleischmann)
Honorary Diploma
 (Velia Vergani)
Tribunal (Herbert Seggelke)
Willem de Kooning, the Painter (Paul Falkenberg and Hans Namuth)
Jury Hommage
Robert Bresson
Award for best interpretation
 (Oleg Kovachev)

References

External links
 
 Venice Film Festival 1966 Awards on IMDb

Venice International Film Festival
Venice International Film Festival
Venice Film Festival
Film
Venice International Film Festival
Venice International Film Festival